This list of songs by the Misfits makes it easy to locate which album/single/ep a particular song has been released on. Many songs have been released multiple times due to the amount of compilation by the group. This list includes songs recorded by the Misfits, regardless of the writing credits.

0–9

A

B

C

D

E

F

G

H

I

J

K

L

M

N

O

P

Q

R

S

T

U

V

W

X

Y

Z

References

Misfits, The